Cartagena Fútbol Club is a Spanish football team based in Cartagena, in the autonomous community of Murcia. They were formerly called UD Cartagenera.

Founded in 1940, it plays in Tercera División RFEF – Group 13, holding home games at Ciudad Deportiva Gómez Meseguer, with a capacity of 3,500 seats.

The club was a reserve team of FC Cartagena, during 2002–2009 and 2011–2014.

History

Club names
Unión Deportiva Cartagenera – (1940–61)
Club Deportivo Cartagena – (1961–74)
Cartagena Fútbol Club – (1974–)

In the 1983–84 season Cartagena was nearly relegated to Segunda División B. The club finished 16th, just one point more than Linares and Algeciras, which moved one division down.

Honours 

 Segunda División B (1): 1991–92
 Tercera División (1): 1979–80

Season to season
As an independent club

As a reserve team

As an independent club

As a reserve team

As an independent club

8 seasons in Segunda División
9 seasons in Segunda División B
31 seasons in Tercera División
1 season in Tercera División RFEF

Selected former players

References

External links

Official website 
Futbolme team profile 

Football clubs in the Region of Murcia
Sport in Cartagena, Spain
Association football clubs established in 1940
Divisiones Regionales de Fútbol clubs
1940 establishments in Spain
Segunda División clubs